Aviance UK was an aircraft ground handling agent, operating at 15 airports in the United Kingdom and many more, as part of its alliance, worldwide. It was a subsidiary of the Go-Ahead Group, a rail, bus and aviation services provider across the UK. In December 2009 it was announced that Aviance UK would move away from the aviation industry beginning with the sale of 11 aviance stations to Servisair with contracts due for exchange by late January 2010. Stations at Heathrow Terminal 1 and Jersey Airport remained with Aviance until its contracts expired in 2011.

History
The name Aviance UK was adopted following the acquisition of Reed Aviation, Midland Airport Services and British Midland International's ground handling activities, which merged with the Go-Ahead owned company Gatwick Handling.

On 31 August 2004, Aviance acquired full ownership of Plane Handling, purchasing the remaining 50% shareholding from its then joint venture partner Virgin Aviation for £20 million.

Operations
Aviance divided operations into several service lines (although not all services were available at every location in the UK):

Ground Handling
Cargo
Lounges
Airport Agencies
Central De-Icing

Former locations
Aberdeen Airport
Belfast City Airport
Belfast International Airport
Birmingham Airport
Cardiff Airport
Edinburgh Airport
Gatwick Airport
Glasgow Airport
Heathrow Airport
Jersey Airport
Liverpool Airport
Luton Airport
Manchester Airport
Southampton Airport
Stansted Airport
Teesside International Airport

References

External links
Company website

Aircraft ground handling companies
Go-Ahead Group companies